The BelleII experiment is a particle physics experiment designed to study the properties of B mesons (heavy particles containing a beauty quark) and other particles. BelleII is the successor to the Belle experiment, and commissioned at the SuperKEKB accelerator complex at KEK in Tsukuba, Ibaraki prefecture, Japan. The BelleII detector was "rolled in" (moved into the collision point of SuperKEKB) in April 2017. BelleII started taking data in early 2018. Over its running period, BelleII is expected to collect around 50 times more data than its predecessor mostly due to a 40-fold increase in an instantaneous luminosity provided by SuperKEKB as compared to the previous KEKB accelerator.

Physics program 
Many interesting analyses of the Belle and BaBar experiments were limited by statistical uncertainties, which was the main motivation to build a new generation of B-factory - Belle II.

The target dataset is 50ab−1 at BelleII compared to 988fb−1 (with 711fb−1 at the Υ(4S) energy) at Belle. The dataset of good runs from Belle II before Long shutdown 1 was 424fb−1 (with 363fb−1 at the Υ(4S) energy.)

This immense dataset would allow studies of rare physics processes, which were out of reach for the previous e e experiments and improve precision on the already measured physics observables.

The physics program of Belle II includes the studies of the following particles or processes:

 B-meson
 Charm meson
 Bottomonium
 Charmonium
 Tau-lepton 
 Dark sector
 Low-multiplicity processes

The majority of the Belle II dataset will be recorded at Upsilon(4S) center-of-mass energy, while a small portion of it will be taken at Upsilon(5S) and as energy scans.

Detector composition 
Belle II is a general purpose high-energy particle physics detector with almost full solid angle coverage. It has a cylindrical shape to cover the e e collisions happening on the central axis of the detector. The detector is asymmetric in beam direction, because the initial energy of the electron beam is larger than the positron beam. Much of the original Belle detector has been upgraded to cope with the higher instantaneous luminosity provided by the SuperKEKB accelerator.

The main components are the following, from the innermost to the outermost systems.:

 Beryllium beam pipe at a minimum radius of 10 mm from the beam
 PiXel Detector (PXD) is composed from two cylindrical layers of depleted field effect transistor (DEPFET) pixels, provide as precise position measurement of the charged particle trajectories. First layer is only 14 mm away from the beam. So far, only two ladders of the second PXD layer have been installed. 
 Silicon Vertex Detector (SVD) - 8 layers of silicon strip sensors arranged in cylindrical barrel and an inclined endcap towards electron direction for better coverage. The SVD and PXD detectors sometimes are referred as VerteX Detector (VXD). The total VXD size has been tuned to cover most of the typical  travel distance.
 Central Drift Chamber (CDC) is a wire chamber central tracking system, which provides the measurement of momentum and charge of the charged particles produced by the collisions as well as particle type identification (PID) via their energy depositions. 
 Aerogel ring-imaging Cherenkov detector (aRICH) provides PID information about the charged particle going into the forward direction.
 Time Of Propagation (TOP)  counter consisting of quartz bars utilising totally internally reflected Cherenkov photons and measuring the time of propagation, which is used for PID. 
 Electromagnetic calorimeter (ECL) a highly segmented array of thallium-doped caesium iodide CsI(Tl) crystals assembled in a projective geometry to measure energies of the neutral final state particles such as photons,  and neutrons, as well as PID. 
 Superconducting solenoid, which provides a 1.5 tesla magnetic field, which bends the trajectories of the final state charged particles to measure their charge and momentum.
  and Muon detector (KLM) used to identify  energy depositions as well as for muon PID.

Timeline 
The Belle II experiment data taking is separated into three phases:
 Phase I — completed Feb–June 2016: SuperKEKB commissioning to characterize the beam environment;
 Phase II — started early 2018, running without the nominal inner silicon-based VXD tracking system to measure the beam-induced background radiation in the innermost tracking system. During this phase the VXD subdetector has been replaced by Beam Exorcism for a Stable ExperimenT II or BEAST II system which was used to test various tracking technologies and a total integrated luminosity of 500 pb has been collected;
 Phase III — started 2019: data taking with the complete Belle II detector;
On November 22, 2018, the Belle II detector was completed with the installation of the VerteX Detector (VXD). On March 25, 2019, the first collisions of the actual physics program were detected.

On 15 June 2020, the SuperKEKB reached an instantaneous luminosity of  — surpassing the LHC's record of  set with proton–proton collisions in 2018.

Scientific personnel 
The Belle II experiment is being governed by Belle II Collaboration, which is an international worldwide scientific community.

The Belle II Collaboration has designed, produced, assembled and is currently operating the Belle II experiment. The collaboration handles the collision data recorded at the experiment, performs the data analysis and delivers the results in form of scientific journal articles, conference talks, etc.

As on May 30, 2019, it included 970 members from 112 institutes and 26 countries around the globe.

Experiment software 
In October 2021 the Software development team within the Belle II Collaboration has published Belle II Analysis Software Framework or basf2 as open-source software on GitHub.

This is the main package used to simulate, reconstruct and analyse the recorded collision events at the Belle II experiment and there are several other separate satellite packages, used for DAQ, computation of the systematic uncertainties, etc.

The backend of the reconstruction and analysis libraries are written in C++, while the analysis steering and facade are implemented in Python language.

To coordinate the software development, the Belle II Collaboration uses industrial collaboration tools such as Atlassian Jira, Confluence and git-based BitBucket service.

See also
B-factory
– oscillation
LHCb experiment

Image gallery

References

External links

BelleII public webpage
BelleII collaboration webpage
German Belle II webpage
A Search for New Physics - The Belle II Experiment
Inside Japan's big physics - Belle II
Record for SuperKEKB-Belle II experiment on INSPIRE-HEP
Record for SuperKEKB project on INSPIRE-HEP

Particle experiments
B physics